The Crossroads (Spanish: La encrucijada) is a 1960 French-Spanish drama film directed by Alfonso Balcázar. The story line is about a couple who trie to scape to France during the Spanish Civil War.

Cast
 Jaime Avellán as Father Antonio  
 Enrique Borrás as Tabernero  
 José María Caffarel as Martínez  
 Roberto Camardiel as Max  
 Carlos Casaravilla as Comandante 
 Antonio Casas as Andrés  
 Michel Corey as Mother of Juan  
 Jean Fabris as Carlos  
 Analía Gadé as Sandra  
 Francisco González as Esteban 
 Gaspar 'Indio' González as Sargento  
 José Palomo as Juan de niño  
 Roberto Palomo 
 Jean-Claude Pascal as Javier  
 Carlos Ronda as Pablo  
 Jaime Viade

References

Bibliography 
 Àngel Comas. Diccionari de llargmetratges: el cinema a Catalunya durant la Segona República, la Guerra Civil i el franquisme (1930-1975). Cossetània Edicions, 2005.
 SOLÉ I IRLA, MARTÍ (1954). "L'épervier de Cerdagne" "Carta de Reyes" "La encrucijada": parlem de pel·lícules rodades íntegrament o en part a la Cerdanya Puigcerdà, l'autor, DL Gi 790-2020.

External links 
 

1960 drama films
Spanish drama films
1960 films
French drama films
1960s Spanish-language films
Films directed by Alfonso Balcázar
1960s Spanish films
1960s French films